The Yes Men are a culture jamming activist duo and network of supporters created by Jacques Servin and Igor Vamos. Through various actions, the Yes Men primarily aim to raise awareness about problematic social and political issues. To date, the duo have produced three films: The Yes Men (2003), The Yes Men Fix the World (2009), and The Yes Men Are Revolting (2014). In these films, they impersonate entities that they dislike, a practice that they call "identity correction." The Yes Men operate under the mission statement that lies can expose truth. They create and maintain fake websites similar to ones they intend to spoof, which have led to numerous interview, conference, and TV talk show invitations.  They espouse the belief that corporations and governmental organizations often act in dehumanizing ways toward the public. Elaborate props are sometimes part of the ruse (e.g. Survivaball), as shown in their 2003 DVD release The Yes Men. The Yes Men have collaborated with other groups of similar interest, including Improv Everywhere, Andrew Boyd and Steve Lambert.

Background 
According to Servin, the Yes Men concept initially sprang from their creation of a fake website spoofing the World Trade Organization. To the surprise of Servin and Vamos, many believed the site to be authentic, and the two were consequently contacted to speak at a conference in Austria. Since this time, the Yes Men have continued performing large-scale hoaxes, in what they describe as a collaborative effort with journalists to help the media tell stories which they believe are important.

The Yes Men often deploy a satirical approach: they pose as a powerful entity (typically a corporate or government representative or executive) and make ridiculous and shocking comments that caricature the ideological position of the organization or person. Furthermore, they acknowledge the idea that many corporate or government entities manipulate their ideology using spin; in response, the Yes Men use this power of spin to their own advantage, and use media outlets to disseminate their personal interpretation of the situation. A sense of humor and shock value is usually employed to make these issues more palatable to the general public and to call greater media attention to stories of interest. Some of these outrageous ideas include the prospect of selling one's vote or a proposition that the poor should consume recycled human waste. On most occasions, little to no shock or outrage is publicly evoked in response to their prank.

On occasion, the Yes Men's phony spokesperson will make announcements that represent fictitious scenarios for the anti-globalization movement or opponents of corporate crime. This has often resulted in false news reports, such as those covering the demise of the World Trade Organization, or Dow Chemical paying compensation to the victims of the Bhopal disaster.

The Yes Men have posed as spokespeople for the WTO, McDonald's, Dow Chemical, and the United States Department of Housing and Urban Development. The two leading members of the Yes Men are known by a number of aliases, most recently, and in film, Andy Bichlbaum and Mike Bonanno (Jacques Servin and Igor Vamos, respectively). Servin is an author of experimental fiction, and was known for being the man who inserted images of men kissing in the computer game SimCopter. Vamos is an associate professor of media arts at Rensselaer Polytechnic Institute, New York. They are assisted by numerous people across the globe. There are other full-time members, such as Whitney Black and Rocco Ferrer, who take a more behind-the-scenes approach.

Their experiences were documented in the film The Yes Men, distributed by United Artists, the film documentary info wars, and the book The Yes Men: The True Story of the End of the World Trade Organization. Andy Bichlbaum and Mike Bonanno also directed a 2009 film entitled The Yes Men Fix the World, which premiered at the Sundance Film Festival. In 2009 they launched their online video channel on Babelgum.

Their third film, The Yes Men Are Revolting, premiered at the 2014 Toronto International Film Festival.

The Yes Men encourage activist and student groups to make their voices heard through crashing conferences, creating fake websites, and getting arrested.

Projects

George W. Bush 
One of the Yes Men's first pranks was the satirical website gwbush.com, established for the 2000 US presidential election to draw attention to alleged hypocrisies on Bush's actual website. When asked about the site in a press conference on May 21, 1999, Bush responded that the website had gone too far in criticizing him.

In 2004, the Yes Men went on tour posing as the group "Yes, Bush Can!" and encouraged supporters to sign a "Patriot Pledge" agreeing to keep nuclear waste in their back yards and send their children off to war. They appeared at the 2004 Republican National Convention and drove across the country at first in an RV with a George W. Bush body wrap, and then in a painted van.

Ice Age Petition 
The Yes Men posed as working as part of the Bush-Cheney campaign. They carried around a petition asking for signatures to support global warming because America's competing countries will suffer while America only bears minor side effects.

Dow Chemical 
On December 3, 2004, the twentieth anniversary of the Bhopal disaster, Andy Bichlbaum appeared on BBC World as "Jude Finisterra", a Dow Chemical spokesman. Dow is the owner of Union Carbide, the company responsible for the chemical disaster in Bhopal, India on December 3, 1984. An estimated 3,800 people died immediately from the hazardous chemicals and thousands more were killed by the plume from the UCC plant during the next few days. The Indian government reported that more than half a million people were exposed to the gas, leading to numerous early and late health defects. The Bhopal Disaster became one of the worst chemical disasters in history and the name Bhopal became synonymous with industrial catastrophe. Immediately after the disaster, UCC began attempts to dissociate itself from responsibility for the gas leak. The Indian Supreme Court eventually mediated a settlement in which UCC accepted moral responsibility and agreed to pay $470 million to the Indian government to be distributed to claimants as a full and final settlement. The average amount to families of the dead was $2,200. Warren M. Anderson, who led the Union Carbide during the Bhopal disaster of 1984, died in 2014 at the age of 92 after fleeing to the United States; his wife, Lillian, stated Anderson suffered "25 years of unfair treatment."

On their fake Dow Chemical website, the Yes Men said that Dow Chemical Company had no intention whatsoever of repairing the damage. The real company received considerable backlash, and both the real Dow and the phony Dow denied the statements, but Dow took no real action.

The Yes Men decided to pressure Dow further, so as "Finisterra," Bichlbaum went on the news to claim that Dow planned to liquidate Union Carbide and use the resulting $12 billion to pay for medical care, clean up the site, and fund research into the hazards of other Dow products. After two hours of wide coverage, Dow issued a press release denying the statement, stating that they had no employee by that name and he was an impostor, ensuring even greater coverage of the phony news of a cleanup. In Frankfurt, Dow's share price fell 4.24 percent in 23 minutes, wiping $2 billion off its market value. The shares rebounded in Frankfurt after the BBC issued an on-air correction and apology. In New York, Dow Chemical's stock were little changed because of the early trading.

After the original interview was revealed as a hoax, Bichlbaum appeared in a follow-up interview on the United Kingdom's Channel 4 news. During the interview he was asked if he had considered the emotions and reaction of the people of Bhopal when producing the hoax. According to the interviewer, "there were many people in tears" upon having learned of the hoax. Bichlbaum said that, in comparison, what distress he had caused the people was minimal to that for which Dow was responsible. The Yes Men claim on their website that they have been told by contacts in Bhopal that once they had got over their disappointment that it wasn't real, they were pleased about the stunt and thought it had helped to raise awareness of their plight.

At the International Payments Conference on April 28, 2005, 'Dow representative' "Erastus Hamm" unveiled Acceptable Risk, the Acceptable Risk Calculator, and the Acceptable Risk mascot — a life-sized golden skeleton named Gilda — to an audience of about 70 banking professionals.

In February 2012, it was widely reported in the 2012 Stratfor email leak that Dow Chemical Company hired private intelligence firm Stratfor to monitor the Yes Men.

WTO 
One of the Yes Men's most famous pranks is placing a "corrected" WTO website at http://www.gatt.org (General Agreement on Tariffs and Trade). The fake site began to receive real emails from confused visitors, including invitations to address various elite groups on behalf of the WTO, to which they responded as if they were the actual WTO. At the WTO, the Yes Men gave speeches encouraging corporations to buy votes directly from citizens. They then unveiled a gold spandex body suit that they said would allow productivity to increase, as managers would not have to oversee workers in person but could keep track of them via images on an attached screen as well as implanted sensors.

New Orleans and HUD 

The Yes Men appeared on August 28, 2006, at a "Housing Summit" in New Orleans, taking the stage along with New Orleans Mayor Ray Nagin and Louisiana Governor Kathleen Blanco. Before an audience composed mostly of real estate developers, one of the Yes Men gave a speech in which he claimed to be Rene Oswin, a fictitious "assistant under-secretary" at the United States Department of Housing and Urban Development (HUD).  In his speech he claimed that HUD would reopen public housing facilities that had been closed since Hurricane Katrina struck in August 2005.  He announced this false claim because HUD had recently decided to only rebuild a third of the subsidized housing stock after Hurricane Katrina, and made plans to demolish four of New Orleans’ ten public housing developments, leaving thousands of New Orleans residents without homes. This decision was contested locally, nationally, and internationally. So, the Yes Men proclaimed that HUD had changed its mind about tearing down the undamaged housing units, and would not tear down the housing projects, as they had planned to do in order to replace them with mixed-income developments.

HUD called this prank, which was intended to bring attention to the lack of affordable housing, a "cruel hoax". A former resident of the community was quoted by Bichlbaum as saying, "do whatever's most effective, do it, don't worry about how it affects us," however. HUD spokeswoman Donna White said no one named "Rene Oswin" works for the department. White commented, "I'm like, who the heck is that?"

The fictitious Oswin also announced that the big oil companies would contribute some of their record profits to rebuild the wetlands destroyed by the construction of oil tanker canals to prevent the city from being inundated by future hurricanes.

ExxonMobil 

On June 14, 2007, the Yes Men acted during Canada's largest oil conference in Calgary, Alberta, posing as ExxonMobil and National Petroleum Council (NPC) representatives. In front of more than 300 oilmen, the NPC was expected to deliver the long-awaited conclusions of a study commissioned by U.S. Energy Secretary Samuel Bodman. The NPC is headed by former ExxonMobil CEO Lee Raymond, who is also the chair of the study. When the Yes Men arrived at the conference they said that Lee Raymond (the promised speaker) was unable to make it due to a pressing situation with the president. The Yes Men then went on to give a presentation in place of Lee Raymond.

In the actual speech, the "NPC rep" announced that current U.S. and Canadian energy policies (notably the massive, carbon-intensive processing of Alberta's oil sands, and the development of liquid coal) are increasing the chances of huge global calamities. But he reassured the audience that in the worst-case scenario, the oil industry could "keep fuel flowing" by transforming the billions of people who would die into oil.

The project, called Vivoleum, would work in perfect synergy with the continued expansion of fossil fuel production. The oilmen listened to the lecture with attention, and then lit "commemorative candles". At this point, event security recognized the Yes Men and forced them off stage, and the 'punchline' — that the candles were made of Vivoleum obtained from the flesh of an "Exxon janitor" who died as a result of cleaning up a toxic spill — was not delivered to the audience, but only to reporters.

New York Times 
The Yes Men (along with the Anti-Advertising Agency) also claimed partial responsibility for a prank on November 12, 2008, where approximately 80,000 copies of a fake edition of the July 4, 2009 edition of The New York Times were handed out on the streets of New York and Los Angeles. The fake edition shows their ideas for a better future with headlines such as Iraq War Ends and Nation Sets Its Sights on Building Sane Economy. The front page contained a spoofed motto, "All the News We Hope to Print" from the famous phrase "All the news that's fit to print". Articles in the paper announce dozens of new initiatives, including an establishment of national health care, a maximum wage for C.E.O.s and an article wherein George W. Bush accuses himself of treason for his actions during his years as president. There is also a Reuters photo of the fake cover page and a fake website, http://www.nytimes-se.com/.

Alex S. Jones, a former Times reporter and media scholar, said of the paper, "I would say if you’ve got one, hold on to it...it will probably be a collector's item. I'm just glad someone thinks The New York Times print edition is worthy of an elaborate hoax. A Web spoof would have been infinitely easier. But creating a print newspaper and handing it out at subway stations? That takes a lot of effort."

New York Post and SurvivaBall 
On September 21, 2009, one day before a UN summit lead-up to the United Nations Climate Change Conference 2009, over 2,000 volunteers distributed throughout New York City a 32-page "special edition" New York Post, blaring headlines (cover story "We're Screwed") that the city could face deadly heat waves, extreme flooding, and other lethal effects of global warming within the next few decades. The paper had been created by the Yes Men and a coalition of activists as a wake-up call to action on climate change.  Other articles describe the Pentagon's alarmed response to global warming, the U.S. government's minuscule response, China's advanced alternative energy program, and how the COP15 in Copenhagen could be a "Flopenhagen". There is also a fake website. A "climate change horoscope" satire on the Sally Brompton horoscope in the Post was commissioned from an environmental activist horoscope writer but was not published.

On September 22, 2009, the Yes Men demonstrated on the alleged behalf of Halliburton and dozens of other climate threatening corporations an inflatable ball-shaped costume known as the SurvivaBall, claiming it was a self-contained living system for surviving disasters caused by global warming. Over two dozen people wore the SurvivaBall costumes as it was demonstrated in the East River. Police shut down the demonstration for lack of a permit. Co-founder of the Yes Men, Andy Bichlbaum, was arrested on an outstanding parking ticket charge and a handful of other Yes Men were served with summons and tickets for disorderly behavior and creating hazardous conditions.

The SurvivaBall was also used in a protest at the steps of the capitol. The protesting balls demanded action be taken on global warming to achieve the 350.org goal. Their strategy was to block the entrance until the government comes to a binding agreement on climate change.

US Chamber of Commerce 
On October 19, 2009, the Yes Men spoofed the United States Chamber of Commerce, declaring a U-turn on their climate change policy. The Yes Men were not able to complete the conference without being exposed as a hoax, although their message that the United States Chamber of Commerce needs to reevaluate their direction in terms of clean energy was their primary concern and was received. Major TV and news organisations carried this story briefly before the hoax was uncovered. The US Chamber of Commerce two weeks later did change their official policy though, according to Al Gore it was "not because of" the Yes Men's stunt. The Chamber launched a trademark and copyright infringement lawsuit against The Yes Men, who were defended by the Electronic Frontier Foundation. The suit was dropped in June 2013.

This action appears in their film, The Yes Men Are Revolting.

Canadian environment minister 
During the 2009 United Nations Climate Change Conference in Copenhagen, the Yes Men put out a statement in which they purported to be the Canadian environment minister, Jim Prentice. The statement pledged to cut carbon emissions by 40% below 1990 levels by 2020. The statement was followed by a response from the Ugandan delegation, praising the statement, that was also faked. Another fake statement was then put out blasting the falsehoods of the original fake statement. A fake story in a European edition of the Wall Street Journal was also posted online. Jim Prentice described the hoax as "undesirable".

Niger Delta Hoax 
On March 28, 2010, a video was released on YouTube with the title "Shell: We are sorry". A man called Bradford Houppe, from the Ethical Affairs Committee at Royal Dutch Shell gave a four-minute-long apology to the people of the Niger Delta for ruining their land, water, and communities. This video was created in response to the numerous environmental problems and human rights violations that have occurred in the Niger Delta region of Nigeria since Shell began oil exploration in the region decades ago. Shell has yet to make any official statement about this video.

GE Tax Refund Hoax reported by the AP 
On April 13, 2011, a hoax website with a URL similar to that of the GE press domain (genewscenter.com) designed to look like the GE news center website. The hoax site posted the claim "GE Responds to Public Outcry – Will Donate Entire $3.2 Billion Tax Refund to Help Offset Cuts and Save American Jobs." and it seems that the AP reported the story as fact, as reported by Good.

Shell Oil and ArcticReady.com 
In June 2012, the Yes Men collaborated with Greenpeace and members of the Occupy Seattle movement to create ArcticReady.com, a parody website criticizing Shell Oil's drilling activities in the Arctic Circle. The website launch was commemorated by a fake launch party held in the Seattle Space Needle. Shell Oil disavowed any affiliation with the website or the launch party on June 14, 2012.

The Action Switchboard 
The Action Switchboard is a platform the Yes Men launched to link up people who want to be involved in activism events with people organising them. As it says "The Action Switchboard is a platform that helps activists find each other, come up with direct action ideas, and get the resources they need to pull them off."

Edward Snowden Politicon interview 
In October 2015, at the annual Politicon non-partisan political convention, the Yes Men promoted an interview with whistleblower Edward Snowden, known to be living in exile in Russia. As they introduced the interview, they announced that Snowden had been pardoned and would join the group in person. As Snowden appeared before them, people cheered, applauded and many rushed the stage for photos. A short time later, another Edward Snowden appeared on the giant screen; however, this time, it was the real Edward Snowden from Russia.

Politicon: new DNC platform 
In July 2017, The Yes Men pranked the Democratic Party at Politicon. Following up the "Better Deal" agenda released by the party a week earlier, prankster Andy Bichlbaum posed as Frank Spencer, Deputy Vice Chair for Civic Engagement of the Democratic National Committee (DNC). As part of the new #DNCTakeBack campaign, Spencer pushed a more ambitious and progressive Democratic agenda, including: Medicare for all, tuition-free college, public campaign financing, stronger unions, an end to corporate lobbying and the end of for-profit prisons.

VW/Dieselgate apology 
In November 2018, Motherboard/Vice released a video about The Yes Men and their fake VW "Emissions Anonymous" project. In the prank, they apologize to the public for the Dieselgate emissions scandal, in which several models and years of VW car family diesel autos were engineered and built with a rigged emissions system that ran clean only while under test conditions, but otherwise released high levels of air pollutants. The Houston Chronicle even covered the pranksters' April 2018 entry in Houston's annual Art Car Parade as if an official VW PR campaign: "The marketing department has even turned the crisis into a publicity shtick".

Fake Washington Post edition
On January 16, 2019, parody editions of The Washington Post were distributed in Washington, D.C. Dated May 1, 2019, the edition's headline read "UNPRESIDENTED" and the lead article described Donald Trump's resignation from the presidency after a period of unrest. The Yes Men took credit for the edition.

COP26 
In November 2021, for the United Nations COP26 climate action summit in Glasgow, the pranksters shared news of a private jet interior design company's membership in the UN's ‘Race to Zero’ program, convincing some that they'd trolled the gathering by getting their fake company admitted. The prank was highlighting the absurdity that such a company actually exists and is a member of a net-zero program.

Footnotes

Further reading

External links 

 
 The Yes Men Fix the World - Peer to Peer Edition Free video download at Internet archive
 The official Yes Men video channel on Babelgum
 Book website
 IMDB - Info Wars
 The Yes Men and Activism in the Information Age(pdf) 
 interview on Bill Moyers Journal, 20 July 2007
 Interview with Andy Bichlbaum from Democracy Now! program, May 12, 2006
 Spoof WTO/GATT website
 The Yes Men Fix the World: In New Film - video report by Democracy Now!
 Shell: We are sorry

 
American performance artists
Anti-consumerist groups
Anti-corporate activists
Anti-globalization organizations
American contemporary artists
Culture jamming
Hoaxes in the United States
Impostors
Performance artist collectives
Political art